Hîrbovăț is a village in the Anenii Noi District of Moldova.

References

Villages of Anenii Noi District